Leo Baumgartner (March 14, 1932 - November 17, 2013) was an Austrian-Australian football player and coach.

References

1961 births
2013 deaths
Austrian footballers
Footballers from Vienna
Australian soccer players
Sydney FC Prague players
Australian people of Austrian descent
Australia international soccer players
National Soccer League (Australia) players
APIA Leichhardt FC players
Kapfenberger SV players
FK Austria Wien players
Hakoah Sydney City FC players
Austria youth international footballers
Association football forwards
Marconi Stallions FC managers
Sydney United 58 FC managers
Sydney FC Prague managers
APIA Leichhardt FC managers
Australian soccer coaches